The streak-throated barwing (Actinodura waldeni) is a species of bird in the family Leiothrichidae. It is found in western Yunnan, southern Tibet, Northeast India and Myanmar.

Its natural habitat is subtropical or tropical moist montane forest.

References

Collar, N. J. & Robson C. 2007. Family Timaliidae (Babblers)  pp. 70 – 291 in; del Hoyo, J., Elliott, A. & Christie, D.A. eds. Handbook of the Birds of the World, Vol. 12. Picathartes to Tits and Chickadees. Lynx Edicions, Barcelona.

rusty-fronted barwing
Birds of Myanmar
Birds of Northeast India
Birds of Yunnan
streak-throated barwing
Taxonomy articles created by Polbot
Taxobox binomials not recognized by IUCN